Dharma Parakramabahu IX was King of Kotte in the sixteenth century, who ruled from 1508/09 to 1513. He succeeded his father Parakramabahu VIII as king of Kotte and was succeeded by his brother Vijayabahu VI.

See also
 List of Sri Lankan monarchs
 History of Sri Lanka

References

External links
 Kingdom of Kandy - Mahanuwara
 Kings & Rulers of Sri Lanka
 Codrington's Short History of Ceylon

Monarchs of Kotte
Parakramabahu
P
P